The Coliséum is a multi-sport arena in Amiens, France. It is the home of the Gothiques d'Amiens of the Ligue Magnus. The center features two ice rinks and an Olympic-sized swimming pool.

History
In 1989, the mayor of Amiens proposed that a new facility replace the aging Palais des Sport, Amiens' 60-year-old sporting facility. While 
the foundation was being laid, in 1993, four Gallo-Roman houses from the first or second century AD were discovered on site and excavated; several tons of historical materials were brought from them to the collection of Amiens.

Events
1997 French Figure Skating championships
Hosted some of the 2006 Men's World Ice Hockey Championships preliminary rounds

External links
 Official site

Indoor ice hockey venues in France
Sports venues in Somme (department)
Buildings and structures in Amiens